DD Chhattisgarh is a state owned TV channel telecasting from Doordarshan Kendra Chhattisgarh. DD Chhattisgarh (DD Raipur) Channel available on DD Free dish channel number 84.

List of programs broadcast by DD Chhattisgarh
 Programme Highlights *
 
Hindi Film Songs Programme *GULDASTA on every Monday from 03:00 to 03:30 pm.

Agriculture based Programme KRISHI DARSHAN daily (except Saturday & Sunday) from 05:00 to 05:30 pm.

Informative Programme about Health & Hygiene HUM AUR HAMARA SWASTH daily (except Saturday & Sunday) from 06:00 to 06:30 pm.

REGIONAL NEWS (Hindi) daily from 06:30 to 06:45 pm.

BHUIYEN KE GOTH on every Tuesday from 04:00 to 04:30 pm.

SUGAM SANGEET on every Wednesday from 03:00 to 03:30 pm.

Live Phone-in Programme SWACHCHH BHARAT on every Wednesday from 04:00 to 04:30 pm.

Live Phone-in Programme HELLO DOCTOR on every Wednesday from 05:00 to 05:30 pm.

BASTAR ANCHAL SE on every Thursday from 04:30 to 05:00 pm.

Live Phone-in Programme AAP KI BAATEN on every Thursday from 05:00 to 05:30 pm.

 All India Radio
 Ministry of Information and Broadcasting
 DD Direct Plus
 List of South Asian television channels by country

References

External links
 Doordarshan Official Internet site
 Doordarshan news site
 An article at PFC

Doordarshan
Mass media in Chhattisgarh
Foreign television channels broadcasting in the United Kingdom
Television channels and stations established in 1994
Indian direct broadcast satellite services
1994 establishments in Madhya Pradesh